Dan Focht (born December 31, 1977) is a Canadian former professional ice hockey defenceman.  He was drafted by the Phoenix Coyotes in the first round, 11th overall, in the 1996 NHL Entry Draft.

After playing three seasons in the Western Hockey League, Focht joined the Coyotes' American Hockey League affiliate, the Springfield Falcons, for the 1997–98 season.  He did not make his NHL debut with the Coyotes, however, until the 2001–02 season, during which he appeared in eight games.

After playing in ten more games for the Coyotes in the 2002–03 season, he was traded to the Pittsburgh Penguins in a multi-player deal which saw Jan Hrdina go to Phoenix.  Focht appeared in 64 games in two seasons with the Penguins.

Most recently, Focht spent the 2005–06 season with the Rochester Americans of the AHL.

Career statistics

External links

1977 births
Living people
Arizona Coyotes draft picks
Canadian expatriate ice hockey players in Finland
Canadian expatriate ice hockey players in the United States
Canadian ice hockey defencemen
Hamilton Bulldogs (AHL) players
Ice hockey people from Saskatchewan
Jokerit players
Mississippi Sea Wolves players
National Hockey League first-round draft picks
Phoenix Coyotes players
Pittsburgh Penguins players
Regina Pats players
Rochester Americans players
Springfield Falcons players
Sportspeople from Regina, Saskatchewan
Tri-City Americans players